Fang Junying (1884–1923) was a Chinese revolutionary.

She was the niece of the progressive reformer Fang Jiashi, a follower of Weng Tonghe, and sister of the revolutionaries Fang Shengdong and Fang Shengtao. From 1901 to 1911, she studied in Japan, and became involved with the revolutionary republican movements among the Chinese students there.  She became a member of the Tonghmenghui in 1905, and head of its assassination section in 1907. In 1908, she participated in a planned assassination of Prince regent Zai Feng. She was one of the ideologists who planned the Guangzhou Uprising on 27 April 1911.

From 1912 to 1922, she studied in France. Upon her return to China, she committed suicide through an overdose of morphine. She stated her reason as her sorrow over the rampant corruption in China.

References 
 Lily Xiao Hong Lee, Clara Lau, A.D. Stefanowska: Biographical Dictionary of Chinese Women: v. 1: The Qing Period, 1644–1911 

1884 births
1923 deaths
1923 suicides
19th-century Chinese people
19th-century Chinese women
20th-century Chinese people
20th-century Chinese women
Chinese expatriates in Japan
Chinese expatriates in France
Drug-related suicides in China